Friendlytown is an abandoned village in the southeastern part of Saline Township in Perry County, Missouri, United States.

Friendlytown had a post office during 1871–1872.

References 

Abandoned villages in Perry County, Missouri